"Parle à ta tête" is a song recorded by French singer-songwriter  Indila. Produced by Skalpovich, it was released by Capitol Music Group on 23 August 2019 and will be included in her upcoming album.

Background
In an interview, Indila shared details on the preparation of her second album:

On 20 August 2019, three days prior to the song's release, she tweeted an apology for her four year long hiatus and hinted at her return with the new single, saying:

"Parle à ta tête" was released on 23 August 2019 and will be included in her upcoming second album.

Music video
The accompanying music video for the song was released on 14 November 2019 on her YouTube channel. The shorter length version was released on 18 December 2019, and is three minutes and eighteen seconds long, whereas the longer version is five minutes and fifty-eight seconds. It begins with Indila in Santa Apolónia train station, in Lisbon, she ejected from her magical suitcase with a monkey before flicking her cloth. She then surprisedly ushered by several dancers and push her to cradle. She finds herself in opera house. At the moment, she encounters a mic in the stage and orders the monkey to quiet its mouth in order to sing. In the next scene, she awakes with flash mob singing the last chorus while recording video with their smartphones and they unexpectedly dispersed away. Awed by the people, Indila picked a flower and piece of paper, and observe the Montmartre using monocular. The video ends with Indila smiling. It was directed by her along with Karim Ouaret.

Charts

Weekly charts

References

External links
 "Parle à ta tête" on YouTube

2019 singles
2019 songs
French-language songs
Electro swing songs
Indila songs